Rebellion (Spanish:Rebeldía) is a 1975 Argentine film.

Cast
The cast of this movie includes: Delfy de Ortega, Francisco de Paula, Linda Peretz and Gabriela Gili.

External links
 

1975 films
Argentine comedy films
1970s Spanish-language films
1970s Argentine films